The Penn State Nittany Lions baseball team is the varsity intercollegiate athletic team of the Pennsylvania State University in University Park, Pennsylvania, United States. The team competes in the National Collegiate Athletic Association's Division I and are members of the Big Ten Conference.

Season by Season Result

College World Series
Penn State baseball has appeared in the College World Series five times. Its best result was runner-up in 1957.

Championship Results
College World Series

Super Regionals

Regionals

All-Time Scores
 1952 (2-2)
 Penn St. 5, Texas 3
 Penn St. 12, Duke 7
 Missouri 3, Penn St. 2
 Holy Cross 15, Penn St. 4
 1957 (3-2)
 Penn St. 7, Florida St. 0
 Penn St. 4, Texas 1
 California 8, Penn St. 0
 Penn St. 5, Notre Dame 4
 California 1, Penn St. 0
 1959 (2-2)
 Penn St. 5, Connecticut 3
 Oklahoma St. 8, Penn St. 6
 Penn St. 7, Clemson 0
 Oklahoma St. 4, Penn St. 3
 1963 (1-2)
 Arizona 8, Penn St. 1
 Penn St. 3, Western Mich. 0
 Texas 6, Penn St. 4 (10innings)
 1973 (0-2)
 Arizona St. 3, Penn St. 1
 Oklahoma 6, Penn St. 0

Awards
Jace Diesing Sr. Most Outstanding Player Award
 1957: Cal Emery

Shutouts
 1957: Ed Drapcho, Penn St. vs. Florida St., 6-8-57 (7-0)
 1959: Ron Riese, Penn St. vs. Clemson, 6-15-59 (7-0)
 1963: Dick Noe, Penn St. vs. Western Mich., 6-11-63 (3-0)

Notable alumni 
To date Penn State has had 89 players drafted and has been the alma mater to 24 MLB Players

Statistical Leaders

Batting

Games Played

At Bats

Runs Scored

Hits

Doubles

Triples

Homeruns

Runs Batted In (RBI)

Stolen Bases

Caught Stealing

Walks

References

External links